Hartsdale Pet Cemetery, also known as Hartsdale Canine Cemetery, is a historic pet cemetery located at Hartsdale, Westchester County, New York. It was established in 1896, and contains over 70,000 interments, with 14,000 interment lots and 7,000 memorials.  Contributing resources include the groundskeeper's cottage, a house, a public memorial to the dogs of war, a mausoleum, and manmade and natural topographical attributes. It is America's largest and oldest pet cemetery.

It was listed on the National Register of Historic Places in 2012.

History
In 1896, Dr. Samuel Johnson, a veterinarian in New York City, offered his apple orchard in Hartsdale as the gravesite for a grieving client, whose dog had died, as animal burials were not permitted in the city. After recounting the story to a friend who was a journalist over lunch, a news article was published in 1898 and later was picked up by The New York Times on September 3, 1905. In the wake of the ensuing publicity, Dr. Johnson received hundreds of requests for pet burials and set aside more of his land until the Hartsdale Canine Cemetery was incorporated on May 14, 1914.

The War Dog Memorial was erected in 1923, featuring a bronze statue of a German Shepherd dog, wearing a blanket with a Red Cross Insignia. It commemorates "man's most faithful friend for the valiant services rendered in the World War, 1914–1918" and a ceremony is held annually in June to honor service dogs.

Notable interments

 Ming of Harlem

Gallery

References

External links

   Official websites

Cemeteries on the National Register of Historic Places in New York (state)
National Register of Historic Places in Westchester County, New York
1896 establishments in New York (state)
Cemeteries in Westchester County, New York
Animal cemeteries
Cemeteries established in the 1890s